The Instituto Tecnológico de Oaxaca (ITO) is a public institution of higher education located in Oaxaca de Juárez, Oaxaca, Mexico.  It was established in April 1968.

The university offers ten undergraduate degree programs and six graduate level programs. ITO is part of the Directorate General of Higher Education Technology (DGEST) of the Secretariat of Public Education of Mexico.

References

Universities and colleges in Oaxaca
Oaxaca
Oaxaca